Cult of Chucky is a 2017 American supernatural slasher film written and directed by Don Mancini. The seventh installment of the Child's Play franchise, following the 2013 film Curse of Chucky, it stars Fiona Dourif, Michael Therriault, Adam Hurtig, Alex Vincent, Elisabeth Rosen, Grace Lynn Kung, Marina Stephenson Kerr, Zak Santiago, Ali Tataryn, Jennifer Tilly, Christine Elise and Brad Dourif. Cult of Chucky began production in Winnipeg, Manitoba, Canada in January 2017 and premiered at the London FrightFest Film Festival on August 24 the same year. As with the previous film, it was released direct-to-video by Universal Pictures Home Entertainment via Blu-ray, DVD and VOD on October 3.

The film received generally positive reviews from critics and, as of October 2017, grossed over $2 million from DVD and Blu-ray sales.

Plot
In 2017, Andy Barclay has been torturing the disembodied head of Chucky for four years. Meanwhile, wheelchair-using Nica Pierce has been in a mental institution after being framed by Chucky for the murders of her family. Nica now believes she was responsible for the murders and that Chucky was a manifestation of her psychosis. Dr. Foley, Nica's doctor, has her transferred to a medium-security psychiatric hospital.

In group therapy, Nica meets Malcolm, a man with Dissociative identity disorder; Angela, a woman who believes she is dead; Claire, a woman who burned her house down; and Madeleine, a patient who smothered her infant son. Foley introduces a therapy technique involving a Good Guy doll. Most of the patients are unsettled except for Madeleine, who treats it as her baby. Nica is visited by Tiffany Valentine, the legal guardian of her niece Alice, and is devastated to learn that Alice has died. Tiffany leaves Nica a Good Guy doll, which she claims was a gift from Alice. That night, Chucky awakens and discovers Nica has slit her wrists. The next morning, Nica finds that her wrists have been stitched up and that Angela has been killed. After realizing "Valentine" was the last name of Chucky's girlfriend, Nica realizes Chucky is real. Fearing Madeleine is in danger, Nica has Malcolm warn her. Madeleine throws both the doll and Malcolm into an empty grave, but they are rescued by orderlies. Malcolm begins to refer to himself as "Charles" and act in a manner similar to Chucky, making Nica suspect he has been possessed. Chucky then kills Claire by decapitating her.

Andy learns about the murders and realizes Chucky has somehow managed to transfer his soul into multiple bodies at once. In a private session with Foley, Nica agrees to be hypnotized in order to access any repressed memories about the murders. Foley, who has been sexually abusing Nica, is hit from behind by Chucky. Foley believes Nica is the one who assaulted him but is willing to keep quiet in order to blackmail her for more sexual favors. Madeleine smothers her Good Guy doll with a pillow, forcing her to confront the repercussions of her real child's death. Orderlies bury the doll in order to placate Madeleine. Andy commits himself into the institution by assaulting a security guard. Carlos, a nurse, delivers a package to Foley—another Good Guy doll with short, shaved hair. Madeleine is visited by her own doll and allows it to kill her.

Foley attempts to assault Nica again but is knocked out by one of the Chucky dolls. Two dolls are now alive due to Madeline's doll splitting its soul inside of Foley's doll. One of the dolls awakens the short-haired doll. The Chuckys reveal that the original Chucky found a voodoo spell on the internet which allowed him to separate his soul into multiple host bodies, creating a "cult." Alice was one host, but she was killed. The dolls then kill Carlos. Tiffany returns and kills a security guard outside. Foley's Chucky doll splits his soul into Nica, giving her body the ability to walk again. She stomps on Foley's head, using high-heeled shoes that Foley had given Nica earlier, killing him. She stumbles upon Malcolm, who has killed fellow Nurse Ashley, before confessing that he knows he's not really Chucky; he merely created "Charles" as an alternative personality. He is suddenly ambushed and killed by Madeleine's Chucky. The short-haired Chucky attacks Andy, but Andy restrains him and reaches into the doll's chest, pulling out a hidden gun and revealing that he sent him to the institution. He shoots the doll and stomps its head, killing him. Nica appears and taunts him. Andy tries to shoot at her, only to discover that he has no ammunition left. Nica locks Andy inside his cell.

Madeleine's Chucky feigns lifelessness and Nica, possessed by Foley's Chucky, escapes. She reunites with Tiffany outside before driving off together with a Tiffany doll, also alive and sharing a portion of Tiffany's soul. In a post-credits scene, Andy's former foster sister, Kyle, enters Andy's house, having been sent to continue torturing the original Chucky's severed head.

Cast
 Fiona Dourif as Nica Pierce
 Alex Vincent as Andy Barclay
 Brad Dourif as the voice of Chucky
 Michael Therriault as Dr. Foley
 Adam Hurtig as "Multiple" Malcolm / Michael
 Elisabeth Rosen as Madeleine
 Grace Lynn Kung as Claire
 Marina Stephenson Kerr as Angela
 Zak Santiago as Nurse Carlos
 Ali Tataryn as Nurse Ashley
 Jennifer Tilly as Tiffany
 Summer Howell as Alice Pierce
 Christine Elise as Kyle

Production

Development
In December 2013, following the release of Curse of Chucky, Don Mancini confirmed that he was planning on developing a seventh installment in the Chucky franchise. By February 2015, Mancini was in the process of writing the script for the film. A year later, Mancini, Jennifer Tilly and Fiona Dourif confirmed that shooting would soon begin for the film. The production office for the film was opened in Winnipeg, Manitoba, Canada in December 2016. Subsequently in January 5, the premise, cast, production schedule and distribution details for Cult of Chucky were revealed, with shooting set to commence four days later. Tony Gardner returned as one of Chucky's puppeteers.

In an October 2013 interview, Mancini revealed that since Child's Play 3, he had always wanted to introduce the concept of "Multiple Chuckys" but was unable to do so due to budget constraints. He eventually used the concept in Cult of Chucky, 26 years later. A reference to Glen/Glenda (a character from Seed of Chucky) was cut out of the film, although it was something that Mancini "definitely wanted to keep".

Casting
Several actors from the previous films, Brad Dourif as Chucky, Fiona Dourif as Nica Pierce, Alex Vincent as Andy Barclay, Jennifer Tilly as Tiffany and Summer H. Howell as Alice returned in the seventh film. Each of them was featured in previous films, with Brad Dourif in all of them, Vincent in Child's Play (1988) and Child's Play 2, Tilly in Bride of Chucky (1998) and Seed of Chucky, and Fiona Dourif and Howell in Curse of Chucky (2013). Cult of Chucky marks Vincent's first principal role in the franchise since he was a child actor, in Child's Play 2, twenty-seven years prior. Although Andy appeared in Child's Play 3, he was played by a different actor, Justin Whalin, due to the events taking place eight years after the second film, which came out less than a year earlier. Alex Vincent also appeared as Andy during a post-credits scene in Curse of Chucky.

Filming
Principal photography for Cult of Chucky began in Winnipeg on January 9, 2017, with the cinematographer from Curse of Chucky, Michael Marshall, returning in the same capacity. Tony Gardner returned to create and perform the Chucky character as he had done previously for Seed of Chucky and Curse of Chucky. Filming ended on February 20 the same year.

Release
Cult of Chucky was released on Blu-ray, DVD, and Netflix (in the USA) on October 3, 2017. It domestically grossed over $2.2 million during the first two weeks.

Unlike the Blu-ray and DVD versions of the film, the Netflix version was not unrated. The rated version is about a minute shorter than the unrated cut, and does not have a post-credits scene.

Shortly before its release, the full film of Cult of Chucky was leaked on to YouTube, which led Don Mancini to tweet: "To the geniuses who leaked #cultofchucky & tweeted about it Congrats, not only are u terrible people, now Universal lawyers know who u r".

Reception
On review aggregator Rotten Tomatoes, the film has an approval rating of 78% based on 27 reviews, and an average rating of 6.1/10. The site’s critics consensus states: “Old Dolls can learn new tricks: This little murderer with a facelift is sillier and better than ever thanks to Don Mancini's Cult of Chucky.” On Metacritic, the film has an average score of 69 out of 100, indicating "generally favorable reviews".

An early review posted on Bloody Disgusting was very favorable of the film. Benedict Seal stated: "Seventh films have no right to be this good or break this much new ground. Cult of Chucky takes this wild story in a whole host of new directions that franchise fans are sure to get a kick out of. There are so many batshit delights, especially as things escalate towards the finale, but to spoil them would be to ruin Mancini and co.'s grand carnival. Without a doubt, Child's Play is a horror franchise worth treasuring." Stephen Dalton of The Hollywood Reporter also had mostly positive things to say about the film, writing, "the bratty quips and cheerfully nasty murders come thick and fast, with drillings and decapitations, high heels and compressed air canisters all part of their repertoire. Mancini's low-key shooting style also shifts up a gear with slow-motion split-screen action and deranged psycho-lesbian clinches, like Brian De Palma on an indie-movie budget. A lean 91 minutes long, Cult of Chucky is part self-spoofing slasher, part lowbrow bloodbath and all guilty pleasure." Scott Mendelson of Forbes said, "Cult of Chucky is either the Final Chapter or a New Beginning. Either way, this most tenacious of horror franchises can walk on with its head held high." William Bibbiani, writing for IGN, gave the film 7.4 out of 10, and specified, "Too many horror sequels feel like cheap and soulless cash-ins. Cult of Chucky has big ideas, strong performances and some moments that rank among the best in the series. The other classic slasher franchises may be failing, but lately, Chucky is making entertaining horror sequels look like child's play."

Accolades
The film received a nomination for Best DVD or Blu-ray Release at the 44th Saturn Awards.

Sequel

In February 2018, a Child's Play television series was announced to be in the works, with involvement from Mancini and producer David Kirschner, and is a continuation of the film's story arc. Mancini also stated that as well as the series, feature films will still continue. The series, titled Chucky, premiered in October 2021; features the return of several cast members, including Brad Dourif, Fiona Dourif, Alex Vincent, Christine Elise, and Jennifer Tilly.

References

External links

 
 
 

2017 direct-to-video films
2017 horror films
2010s serial killer films
American direct-to-video films
American sequel films
American slasher films
Child's Play (franchise) films
Direct-to-video horror films
Direct-to-video sequel films
Films about paraplegics or quadriplegics
Films directed by Don Mancini
Films shot in Winnipeg
Films set in Alaska
Films set in 2017
Universal Pictures direct-to-video films
Films set in psychiatric hospitals
2010s slasher films
2010s English-language films
2010s American films
Films about Voodoo